William Henry Bidlake MA, FRIBA (12 May 1861 – 6 April 1938) was a British architect, a leading figure of the Arts and Crafts movement in Birmingham and Director of the School of Architecture at Birmingham School of Art from 1919 until 1924.

Several of Bidlake's houses in the Birmingham area were featured in Hermann Muthesius's book  (The English House), which was to prove influential on the early Modern Movement in Germany.

Life and career 
Bidlake was born in Wolverhampton, the son of local architect George Bidlake (1830–1892) from whom he received his earliest architectural training. He attended Tettenhall College and Christ's College, Cambridge. In 1882 he moved to London where he studied at the Royal Academy Schools and worked for Gothic Revival architects Bodley and Garner. In 1885 he won the RIBA Pugin Travelling Fellowship for his draughtsmanship, which enabled him to spend 1886 travelling in Italy.

On returning to England in 1887 Bidlake settled in Birmingham where he set up in independent practice and, from 1893, pioneered the teaching of architecture at the Birmingham School of Art. Famously ambidextrous, his party trick was to sketch with both hands simultaneously.

Bidlake designed many Arts and Crafts-influenced houses in upmarket Birmingham districts such as Edgbaston, Moseley, and Four Oaks (the latter then in Warwickshire and absorbed into Birmingham in 1974), along with a series of more Gothic-influenced churches such as St Agatha's, Sparkbrook – generally considered his masterpiece.

He was an associate, member, treasurer and then, from 1902–38, Professor of Architecture of the Royal Birmingham Society of Artists.

In 1924, Bidlake married a woman over twenty years younger than himself and moved to Wadhurst in East Sussex, where he continued to practise until his death there in 1938.

Major built works 

St Thomas' Church, Stourbridge. Apse (1890), north chancel screen (nd).
The Dene, 2 Bracebridge Road, Sutton Coldfield, Birmingham (1895–1896), Grade II listed
Woodside, 51 Bracebridge Road, Four Oaks, Sutton Coldfield (1898) – built for himself
17 Barker Road, Sutton Coldfield, Birmingham (1898), Grade II listed
St Oswald's Church, Small Heath, Birmingham (1892–9), Grade II* listed
18 Dora Road, Small Heath, Birmingham (1899), Grade II listed
College of Art, Balsall Heath, Birmingham (1899), Grade II* listed
St Patrick's Church, Salter Street, Hockley Heath, Birmingham (chancel) (1899), Grade II* listed
Woodgate, 37 Hartopp Road, Four Oaks, Sutton Coldfield (1900) – built for himself, Grade II listed
Garth House, 47 Edgbaston Park Road, Edgbaston, Birmingham (1901), Grade II* listed
The Hurst, 6 Amesbury Road, Moseley, Birmingham
Emmanuel Church, Sparkbrook Birmingham (1901)
St Agatha's Church, Stratford Road, Sparkbrook, Birmingham (1901), Grade I listed 
100 Sampson Road, Sparkbrook, Birmingham (St Agatha's Vicarage) (1901), Grade II* listed 
St Winnow, 22 Ladywood Road, Sutton Coldfield, Birmingham (1902), Grade II listed
Bishop Latimer Memorial Church, Winson Green, Birmingham (1904)
The Knoll, Glebe Road, Oadby, Leicestershire (1907), Grade II listed and Stables, Grade II listed
St Andrew's Church, Oxhill Road, Handsworth, Birmingham (1907–9), Grade I listed
St Matthew's Church, Shuttington, Warwickshire (restoration) (1908–1909), Grade II listed
St Mary's Church, Wythall, Worcestershire. Roof and stair turret (nd).
Emmanuel Church, Wylde Green, Sutton Coldfield (1909), Grade II* listed
Gates and four sets of gate piers to Handsworth Cemetery. (1909), Grade II listed
Lodge to Handsworth Cemetery (1909), Grade II listed 
Mortuary Chapel, Handsworth Cemetery (1910)
St Clears, 79 Farquhar Road, Birmingham (1914), Grade II listed
Sparkhill United Church, Stratford Road (1932–3)

References

Sources

Foster, Andy. Pevsner Architectural Guides: Birmingham. Yale University Press: New Haven & London, 2005 
Crawford, Alan (ed.). By Hammer and Hand: The Arts and Crafts Movement in Birmingham. Birmingham Museums and Art Gallery, 1984 
Mitchell, Trevor. Birmingham's Victorian and Edwardian Architects Phillada Ballard. ed. Oblong, 2009 . http://www.victoriansociety.org.uk/news/new-book-celebrates-birminghams-victorian-and-edwardian-architects/.

1861 births
1938 deaths
Alumni of Christ's College, Cambridge
Architects from Birmingham, West Midlands
People from Wolverhampton
People educated at Tettenhall College
Members and Associates of the Royal Birmingham Society of Artists
Fellows of the Royal Institute of British Architects